Joseph Marshall (active 1755-1779) was an 18th-century British marine painter. He is best known as the painter of a series of paintings of ship models, commissioned by George III of Great Britain in 1773 but only completed in 1779. He worked from the ships' plans rather than models to produce bow and stern images of ten ships, representing every class in the Royal Navy at that time.

Twenty of the paintings were given to the Science Museum, London by Queen Victoria and two showing stern views of HMS Enterprise and HMS Royal George are now in the National Maritime Museum The two of Alert were given separately to the Science Museum in 1904.

Citations

18th-century British painters
British marine artists
Year of birth missing
Year of death missing